This is a list of wars involving Lesotho and its processing states.

References

Lesotho
 
Wars